Larini may refer to:
 Larini-ye Olya
 Larini-ye Sofla